The Encarta Webster's Dictionary of the English Language (2004) is the second edition of  the Encarta World English Dictionary, published in 1999 (Anne Soukhanov, editor).  Slightly larger than a college dictionary, it is similar in appearance and scope to the American Heritage Dictionary, which Soukhanov previously edited.  Created using the Bloomsbury dictionary database, it draws on English as it is spoken in all parts of the English-speaking world.  

A distinctive feature of the dictionary is the abbreviated definitions, highlighted prior to the full definition, for a quick glance meaning or to identify the sense being sought.

The Encarta name is also used for the abbreviated college dictionary editions.

Publication data
Encarta World English Dictionary (1999), Anne Soukhanov, editor. St. Martin's Press, 2078 p., 
Microsoft Encarta College Dictionary: The First Dictionary For The Internet Age, (2001), Anne Soukanov, editor. St. Martin's Press, 1728 p., 
Encarta Webster's Dictionary of the English Language: Second Edition (2004), Anne Soukhanov, editor. Bloomsbury Publishing, PLC, 2208 p., 
Encarta Webster's College Dictionary: 2nd Edition  (2005), Kathy Rooney, editor,  Bloomsbury Publishing PLC, 1728 p.,

See also
 Webster's Dictionary

External links
"Which Webster's Dictionary Is the Real Thing?", by Richard Norquist

1999 non-fiction books
English dictionaries